The 1985 Harvard Crimson football team was an American football team that represented Harvard University during the 1985 NCAA Division I-AA football season. Harvard tied for second in the Ivy League.

In their 15th year under head coach Joe Restic, the Crimson compiled a 7–3 record and outscored opponents 192 to 136. James B. Wilkinson was the team captain.

Harvard's 5–2 conference record tied for second-best in the Ivy League standings. The Crimson outscored Ivy opponents 140 to 92.

The Crimson briefly appeared in the weekly national top 20, achieving No. 16 in the poll released October 1, but fell out of the rankings the next week and remained unranked through the end of the season.

Harvard played its home games at Harvard Stadium in the Allston neighborhood of Boston, Massachusetts.

Schedule

References

Harvard
Harvard Crimson football seasons
Harvard Crimson football
Harvard Crimson football